Tessa Carvalho (born 13 December 1966) is a former synchronized swimmer from Brazil.

Tessa's sister is Paula Carvalho, who was her partner in the women's duet at the 1984 Summer Olympics.

References 

1966 births
Living people
Brazilian synchronized swimmers
Olympic synchronized swimmers of Brazil
Synchronized swimmers at the 1984 Summer Olympics